Account-based marketing (ABM), also known as key account marketing, is a strategic approach to business marketing based on account awareness in which an organization considers and communicates with individual prospect or customer accounts as markets of one. Account-based marketing is typically employed in enterprise-level sales organizations.

Account based marketing can help companies to:
 Increase account relevance
 Engage earlier and higher with deals
 Align marketing activity with account strategies
 Get the best value out of marketing 
 Inspire customers with compelling content
 Identify specific contacts, at specific companies, within a specific market 
While business marketing is typically organized by industry, product/solution or channel (direct/social/PR), account-based marketing brings all of these together to focus on individual accounts.
As markets become increasingly commoditized, customers see little or no difference between suppliers and their competitors, with price as the only obvious differentiator.

Background and differences with traditional business marketing 

In the marketing of complex business propositions, account-based marketing plays a key role in expanding business within existing customer accounts (where, for example, wider industry marketing would not be targeted enough to appeal to an existing customer). In scenarios where the initial sale has taken several months, it is reported that account-based marketing delivers an increase in the long-term value of the customer. ABM can also be applied to key prospect accounts in support of the first sale. For example, Northrop Grumman employed ABM to aid in the completion of a successful $2 billion deal.

Research demonstrates that buyers are looking for their existing suppliers to keep them updated with relevant propositions, but are often disappointed with this. In UK research, existing suppliers topped the different information channels that IT buyers use to look for new solutions – but more than 50% of buyers felt that marketing by their suppliers was poor. The research also demonstrates that it is easier for organizations to generate sales from existing customers than from new customers - 77% of decision-makers say that marketing from new suppliers is poorly targeted and makes it easy to justify staying with their current supplier. By treating each account individually, account-based marketing activity can be targeted more accurately to address the audience and is more likely to be considered relevant than untargeted direct marketing activity.

The roles of sales and marketing teams 

ABM is an  example of the alignment of sales and marketing teams. In the aligned model, organizations able to unite tactical marketing efforts with defined sales goals and use feedback from sales to identify new potential markets. For ABM to succeed, joint working relationship with sales is essential and marketing needs to be measuring and optimizing based on accounts. ABM is targeted at accounts (or companies as a whole) as opposed to inbound marketing, which is targeted at leads (or people within these companies). The need for sales and marketing alignment also comes from the fact that there is an inherent disconnect between marketers, who market to people, and sales people, who sell to companies (or structured groups of people). 

Marketing will also take an increased role in developing intelligence on key accounts – as proposed by Peppers and Rogers (1993): “When two marketers are competing for the same customer’s business, all other things being equal, the marketer with the greatest scope of information about that particular customer […] will be the more efficient competitor.”

Account-based marketing and the IT industry 

Organizations which are seeing the greatest current benefit from account-based marketing are IT, Services and Consulting companies. With complex propositions, long sales cycles and large customers, these organizations are ideal candidates for the approach. It is, though, spreading into other sectors and a benefit can be seen to be an increased return on time (ROT). Many suppliers have woken up to the fact that the revenues of some of their customers exceed the GDP of some nation states. They are changing the amount of their resourcing accordingly.

Choosing the key account 

Key accounts are accounts that are identified within organizations as being a focus for account-based marketing. Not all accounts meet the requirements to be designated as a strategic or key account and organizations need to be careful about which accounts to focus on for their account-based marketing efforts or risk losing a valuable client. When choosing, organizations should look at revenue history, account history, margins and profitability as well as the viability that the client in question would be interested in a long-term relationship. Lastly, asking what the client and the company have in common helps in solidifying the approach that the client cannot find this kind of service anywhere else. To select the companies that bring you the highest profits you can apply the Pareto Principle.

There are also some red flags that help recognize that a relationship with a key account is about to change:

 Business that regularly would have come to the company goes elsewhere
 A re-organization within the company forces a change in relationship
 Both involved companies aren't seeing ROI from the relationship
 Mutual goals are not achieved

References 

Sales
Marketing